William de Heytisbury DD (also Hetisbury and Heighterbury) was an English college fellow and university chancellor.

William de Heytisbury was a Fellow of Merton College, Oxford and Chancellor of the University of Oxford between 1371 and 1372. He was a Doctor of Divinity.

References

Year of birth unknown
Year of death unknown
Fellows of Merton College, Oxford
Chancellors of the University of Oxford
14th-century English people